Randall K. Cooper High School (also known as Cooper High School) is a public high school located in Union, Kentucky, in the Cincinnati metropolitan area. It is the fourth high school in the Boone County School system. The school was named in honor of the late founding principal of Ryle High School, Randy Cooper.

Some middle schools that feed into this school are Ockerman Middle School, Camp Ernst Middle School, and Ballyshannon Middle School.

This school was expanded before the 2014–2015 school year to accommodate growth that is occurring in surrounding neighborhoods that feed into the school.

Athletics
Cooper High School is a member of the KHSAA. The school colors are Maroon and Gold and its mascot is the Jaguar.

References

External links
Homepage

Public high schools in Kentucky
Educational institutions established in 2008
Schools in Boone County, Kentucky
2008 establishments in Kentucky
Union, Kentucky